In baseball, a double is a hit in which the batter advances to second base in one play, with neither the benefit of a fielding error nor another runner being put out on a fielder's choice.  A batter may also be credited with a ground-rule double when a fair ball, after touching the ground, bounds into the stands or becomes lodged in a fence or scoreboard.

Hall of Fame center fielder Tris Speaker holds the Major League Baseball career doubles record with 792. Pete Rose is second with 746, the National League record. Speaker, Rose, Stan Musial (725), and Ty Cobb (724) are the only players with more than 700 doubles. Albert Pujols is the active leader and has the most career doubles by a right-handed hitter with 685. Only doubles hit during the regular season are included in the totals (Derek Jeter holds the record in post-season doubles, with 32).

Key

List

Stats updated as of the end of the 2022 season.

Notes

See also
 List of Major League Baseball career triples leaders
 List of Major League Baseball career home run leaders

References

External links

Major League Baseball

Doubles records 400
Major League Baseball statistics